Larissa Iapichino (born 18 July 2002) is an Italian long jumper who won silver medal at the 2023 European Indoor Championships.

Biography

She is the daughter of former pole vaulter Gianni Iapichino and former long jumper Fiona May, who is a two time Olympic silver medalist. In 2020 at under-20 level her personal best, 6.80 m, was the 5th best world performance of 2020 and 2nd all-time in Italy lists at senior level, 4th all time U20 world wide at first year of category.

Career
She start her youth carrier winning gold medal at the 2019 European Athletics U20 Championships. On 20 February 2021, Iapichino long jumped  a World Record Under-20 years.

Statistics

World record
Under 20
Long jump: 6.91 m –  Ancona, 20 February 2021

National records
Senior
 Long jump indoor: 6.97 m -  Istanbul, 5 March 2023

Under 20
 Long jump: 6.80 m –  Savona, 16 July 2020

Achievements

National titles
Iapichino has won five national championships at individual senior level.

Italian Athletics Championships 
Long jump: 2020, 2021, 2022 (3)
Italian Athletics Indoor Championships 
Long jump: 2021, 2023 (2)

See also
 Italian all-time lists - Long jump

References

External links
 

2002 births
Living people
Italian female long jumpers
Athletics competitors of Fiamme Gialle
People from Borgo San Lorenzo
Italian people of English descent
Italian Athletics Championships winners
Italian people of Jamaican descent
Sportspeople of Jamaican descent
Sportspeople from the Metropolitan City of Florence